Orzubek Shayimov is an Uzbekistani boxer who competes as a bantamweight. At the 2012 Summer Olympics he was defeated in the heats of the Men's bantamweight by Robenílson Vieira.

References

Living people
Olympic boxers of Uzbekistan
Boxers at the 2012 Summer Olympics
Bantamweight boxers
1987 births
Boxers at the 2006 Asian Games
Boxers at the 2010 Asian Games
Uzbekistani male boxers
Asian Games competitors for Uzbekistan